The University College Dublin Economics Society is a group that promotes engagement with economics while promoting a "feeling of community" at University College Dublin among students interested in economics. The society has over 700 members drawn from different faculties in the college. Individuals who have addressed the society had included Governor of the Irish Central Bank Patrick Honohan, and economists David McWilliams and Morgan Kelly.

History
The Society was first established in 1911 as the Legal & Economic Society. The prominent professor and politician, J.G. Swift MacNeilll, gave the inaugural address. Founding members included Thomas Kettle, Conor Maguire, Thomas Arkins and Arthur Cox. The Society ran a number of small debates in its early years and struggled to maintain its activity during the Irish War of Independence and Civil War. In the 1930s, the Legal and Economic society split into the University College Dublin Law Society. The Economic Society was founded again in 1968. But later disbanded until being re-established in 2013.

Activities
The society hosts a range of events including guest speakers, panel discussions and debates. The societies flagship is the "Thinking Big" two-day conference hosted in the Fitzgerald Chamber started in 2013. This looks at biggest challenges facing Ireland and the world. Speakers at the 2014 event included Lucinda Creighton, Professor Ron Davies and Habitat for Ireland CEO Vince Cunningham.

Guest speakers 
The society regularly invites speakers to address the society. Speakers have included the then Minister for State and later Minister for Health Simon Harris, Nobel laureate Eric Maskin Peter Sutherland, Bob Geldof, Dr Dambisa Moyo, Professor Jeffrey Sachs, Dr James Hoare, and then Leader of the Green Party Eamon Ryan.

Honorary life memberships 

The Society presents an Honorary Life Membership called Thomas Kettle award in honor of Thomas Kettle. Kettle, in 1908, was the first Professor of National Economics at University College Dublin and also one of the founders of the Legal and Economics Society. He later died leading a company of his men on 9 September 1916, aged 36, during the Battle of the Somme in France.

References

University College Dublin
Student organisations in the Republic of Ireland
1911 establishments in Ireland